Nathan H. Haller (July 8, 1845 – February 27, 1917) was a politician in Texas. Enslaved before the American Civil War, he was elected member to the Texas House of Representatives in 1892 and re-elected to a second term. He was one of 52 African Americans to serve the Texas Legislature during the 19th century.

He served two terms from 1893 until 1897, the second after winning a court fight over the election. He was one of the last two African Americans (Robert Lloyd Smith was the other) to hold state office in Texas before 1966.

He had worked as a free farmer, a blacksmith and also a wagon driver.

He married Paralee Jordan of Huntsville and two sons, Stonewall Jackson Haller and James Haller.

He died February 27, 1917, in Houston.

See also
African-American officeholders during and following the Reconstruction era

References

Members of the Texas House of Representatives
1845 births
1917 deaths
African-American politicians during the Reconstruction Era
Farmers from Texas
American freedmen
American blacksmiths
20th-century African-American people